Ryan Sissons (born 24 June 1988) is a New Zealand triathlete. Born in Bulawayo, Zimbabwe, Sissons represented New Zealand at the 2012 London Olympics in the triathlon where he finished 33rd.  At the 2014 Commonwealth Games, he finished in 13th in the individual event and was part of the New Zealand mixed relay team that finished in 5th.  At the 2016 Summer Olympics, he finished in 17th. At the 2017 ITU World series in Hamburg, Ryan finished 3rd. At the age of 32, Ryan retired in 2020 after the Tokyo Olympic Games were postponed, with no guarantees that the games would go ahead in 2021.

References

1988 births
Living people
Sportspeople from Bulawayo
Triathletes at the 2012 Summer Olympics
Olympic triathletes of New Zealand
New Zealand male triathletes
Triathletes at the 2014 Commonwealth Games
Triathletes at the 2016 Summer Olympics
Zimbabwean emigrants to New Zealand
White Zimbabwean sportspeople
Triathletes at the 2018 Commonwealth Games
Commonwealth Games bronze medallists for New Zealand
Commonwealth Games medallists in triathlon
20th-century New Zealand people
21st-century New Zealand people
Medallists at the 2018 Commonwealth Games